Padalathri Narasimhar Temple or Narasimhar Temple (also called Singaperumal Koil) is dedicated to Hindu god Vishnu (Narasimha) located in Singaperumal Koil, near Chennai City, in the South Indian state of Tamil Nadu. Constructed as rock-cut architecture, dedicated to Vishnu, who is worshipped as Narasimhar, and his consort Lakshmi as Ahobilavalli, the temple was built by the Pallavas during the 8th century. Earlier in Kanchipuram district, it is now under Chengalpattu district.

The temple is open from 7 a.m. to 12 p.m. and 4:30 p.m. to 8:30 p.m. and has four daily rituals at various times of the day. Various festivals are celebrated in the temple, with the Chittirai Brahmotsavam during April–May, Narasimha Jayanthi, Pavithra Utsavam during Aani (June–July) and Maasi float festival (Theppam) during February–March being the most prominent. The temple is maintained and administered by the Hindu Religious and Endowment Board of the Government of Tamil Nadu.

Legend

According to the Hindu legend, Singaperumal Kovil is referred by a Sanskrit Padalathri. The temple finds mention in Brahmanda Purana, which mentions that Vishnu appeared as Narasimha to the sages performing penance at this place after killing the asura king Hiranyakashipu. Hiranyakashipu was troubling the devas as he got a boon from Brahma, that neither human nor an animal could kill him. His son Prahlada was an ardent devotee of Vishnu, which Hiranyakashipu discouraged. He also tried to slay Prahlada by various means, but was saved by the divine grace of Vishnu. Vishnu took the avatar of Narasimha and appeared from a pillar. Narasimha, as a lion-man deity, Hiranyakashipu on an evening time in a doorway, which was neither land nor air. His anger was not quenched even after slaying the asura king, but Prahlada sang and prayed Narasimha to calm down, which he acceded to. He is also believed to have quenched his anger by bathing at the temple tank in this place. The water is believed to have turned red after the incident.

History

Singaperumal Kovil was originally called by various names like Alvar Narasingadevar, and Narsinga Vinnagar Alvar. The original temple is believed to have been built in Rock-cut architecture by the Pallavas, who built cave temples of similar kind in the area. The inscriptions on the walls of the temple are from the chola regime during the 10-11th centuries. The inscriptions are made in Telugu, Grantha and Tamil scripts. The oldest inscription is found from the period of Raja Raja Chola (985-1016 CE), the most famous Chola emperor from Thanjavur in 990 indicating a gift of 26 sheep for the perpetual lighting of the temple. Another inscription from Andal shrine is mutilated, but indicates a gift by an individual to the presiding deity. The third inscription is mutilated, presumably from the 11th century indicating gifts to the temple.

Architecture

The presiding deity housed in the sanctum in a cave is a rock-cut image, in seated posture with his right leg bent and left leg left hanging. Narasimha has four hands with two of the top hands holding his  conch and  Chakra, while the other two hands showing Abaya Mudra and Uru hasta (resting on his lap). Ugra Narasimha is sported with a third eye on his forehead, which is usually a feature of Shiva temples. The sanctum is guarded by two Dvarapalas image on either sides. The shrine of his consort, Ahobilavalli is located in the second precinct, which is believed to be a later addition. There is a shrine of Andal located to the right of the sanctum. While the two shrines of Ahobilavalli and Andal have precincts, unlike the shrine of Narasimhar.

The shrine of Garuda facing Narasimhar, the eagle mount of Vishnu, is located axial to the central shrine. The central shrine is approached through Mahamandapa, the worship hall and a narrow Ardha mandapam. The flagpost is located behind the shrine of Garuda, axial to the central shrine and the gateway tower. There are images of Alvars in the worship hall on both sides and the shrine of Ahobilavalli is located in the second precinct. The vimana, the roof over the sanctum, has stucco images of various avatars of Vishnu. There are separate shrines of Lakshmi Narasimha, Ramanuja, Manavala Mamunigal, and Vishvaksena.

Worship practices and festivals

The temple follows Tenkalai tradition of worship based on Vaikasana Agamic tradition. The temple is open from 6:30 a.m. to 12 p.m. and 4:00 p.m. to 8:30 p.m. The temple priests perform the puja (rituals) during festivals and on a daily basis. As at other Vishnu temples of Tamil Nadu, the priests belong to the Brahmin varna of the Vaishnavaite community. The temple rituals are performed four times a day: Ushathkalam at 8 a.m., Kalasanthi at 10:00 a.m., Sayarakshai at 5:00 p.m. and Ardha Jamam at 8:00 p.m. Each ritual has three steps: alangaram (decoration), neivethanam (food offering) and deepa aradanai (waving of lamps) for both Narasimhar and his consort Ahobilavalli. There are weekly, monthly and fortnightly rituals performed in the temple.

Various festivals are celebrated in the temple, with the Chittirai Brahmotsavam during April–May, Narasimha Jayanthi, Pavithra Utsavam during Aani (June–July) and Maasi float festival during February–March being the most prominent. During Aani Brahmotsavam, the temple car housing the festival deities of Narasimhar and Ahobilavalli is drawn around the streets of Singaperumalkoil. During the float festival in February–March, the presiding deities are drawn in a float in the temple tank. There are festivals almost every month in the temple. The temple is maintained and administered by the Hindu Religious and Endowment Board of the Government of Tamil Nadu.

See also
 Lakshmi-Narasimha
 Thirukachur Marundeeswarar Temple
 Thirukachur Kachabeswarar Temple

References

External links

Hindu temples in Kanchipuram district
Vishnu temples